There are over 20,000 Grade II* listed buildings in England. This page is a list of these buildings in the district of Cannock Chase in Staffordshire.

Listed buildings

See also
 Grade I listed buildings in Staffordshire
 Grade II* listed buildings in Staffordshire
 Grade II* listed buildings in East Staffordshire
 Grade II* listed buildings in Lichfield (district)
 Grade II* listed buildings in Newcastle-under-Lyme (borough)
 Grade II* listed buildings in South Staffordshire
 Grade II* listed buildings in Stafford (borough)
 Grade II* listed buildings in Staffordshire Moorlands
 Grade II* listed buildings in Stoke-on-Trent
 Grade II* listed buildings in Tamworth (borough)

Notes

External links

 
Cannock Chase District
Lists of Grade II* listed buildings in Staffordshire